Ghoti is a creative respelling of the word fish.

Ghoti may also refer to:

 Ghoti people, a social group native to West Bengal, India
 Ghoti Budruk, a census town in Nashik district in  Maharashtra state, India
 Ghoti Khurd, a small village in Maharashtra state, India
 Ghoti Hook, a former Christian punk band from Fairfax, Virginia, United States

See also
 Ghotki (disambiguation)